"Glorious Things of Thee Are Spoken", also called "Zion, or the City of God", is an 18th-century English hymn written by John Newton, who also wrote the hymn "Amazing Grace". Shape note composer Alexander Johnson set it to his tune "Jefferson" in 1818, and as such it has remained in shape note collections such as the Sacred Harp ever since. However, the hymn is most often set to the tune of Joseph Haydn's "Gott erhalte Franz den Kaiser" (referred to in hymnals as "Austria"). In recent decades it has been sometimes replaced by "Abbot's Leigh". This was written for this text by Cyril Vincent Taylor in 1942 while he was a producer of Religious Broadcasting at the BBC and stationed at the village of Abbots Leigh. Multiple other tunes have also been used with the hymn.

History 
The hymn was written by Newton after he had asked for assistance from his friend and neighbour, classical writer William Cowper, while he was the Church of England parish priest of Olney Church. With Cowper's assistance, Newton was able to publish the Olney Hymns Hymnal, which included "Glorious Things of Thee Are Spoken", in 1779. The hymn is based upon Psalm 87:3 and Isaiah 33:20–21. "Glorious Things of Thee Are Spoken" is considered to be Newton's best composition and was the only joyful hymn in the publication. The hymn has five verses of eight lines each.

The hymn was a favourite of Confederate General Stonewall Jackson. He is noted to have once awakened his soldiers in 1862 while they were in the Shenandoah Valley by singing "Glorious Things of Thee Are Spoken" out of tune.

Tune 

Because of the practice of singing the hymn to a tune used for other purposes it has sometimes elicited unusual reactions. In 1936, the German Ambassador to the United Kingdom, Joachim von Ribbentrop gave a Nazi salute in Durham Cathedral when the hymn was played and had to be restrained by the Marquess of Londonderry. During the Second World War in an Oflag prisoner of war camp, a Protestant service was interrupted during the singing of "Glorious Things of Thee Are Spoken" by the camp guards singing Sei gesegnet ohne Ende, because the hymn was set to the same tune. The same Haydn melody is employed in the German national anthem formerly known, popularly, as Deutschland über alles — properly titled Das Lied der Deutschen or the Deutschlandlied, the third verse of which is the national anthem of present-day Germany.  For some people, using this particular tune for the hymn (often named in various hymnals as "Austria") is often controversial as, despite the fact that it dates back to the 18th century, it raises reminders of Nazi Germany. Cyril Vincent Taylor's Abbot's Leigh tune was written in response to complaints received by the BBC during the war.

Below, a setting of the hymn as it appears in the Army and Navy Hymnal (1920):

Usage 
The hymn is used by a wide range of Christian denominations, including Catholics. Words of the hymn may be changed depending on, for example, whether the congregation is Calvinist or Lutheran.  Presbyterians often sing only three verses of the hymn. 

John Rogers Thomas also used the words for one of his sacred songs from Hymns of the Church.

Footnotes

References

External links 
 Third edition (1783) of Olney Hymns, in Three Books on the Internet Archive
 "Glorious Things of Thee Are Spoken" sung to the tune "Austria" by the choir of York Minster
 "Glorious Things of Thee Are Spoken" sung to the tune "Abbot's Leigh" by the Choir of King's College, Cambridge

English Christian hymns
Church of England
1779 in Christianity
18th-century hymns
Hymns by John Newton